José Greco ( Costanzo Greco; December 23, 1918 – December 31, 2000) was an Italian-born American flamenco dancer and choreographer known for popularizing Spanish dance on the stage and screen in America mostly in the 1950s and 1960s.

Background
José Greco was born as Costanzo Greco in Montorio nei Frentani to Paolo Emilio and Maria Carmela ( Bucci) Greco. He would later legally change his name. When he was 10 years old, Greco and his family moved to New York City. He began dancing in Brooklyn with his sister Norina at a young age.

Career

Greco made his professional dancing debut in 1937 at the Hippodrome Theatre in Manhattan. His most famous partners were La Argentinita (Encarnación López Júlvez) and, after her death, her sister Pilar López. In 1949, he formed the José Greco Dance Company, with which he toured extensively.

He also appeared in a number of films, including Sombrero (1953), Around the World in 80 Days (1956), Holiday for Lovers (1959), Ship of Fools (1965), and The Proud and the Damned (1972).

In 1951 Greco made his first appearance in the UK at the Sadler's Wells Theatre. Later in the decade in 1954 and again in 1957 his troupe collaborated with Alfredo Antonini and members of the New York Philharmonic while performing during open air concerts at Lewisohn Stadium in New York City. 

Greco received many honors and awards including being knighted by the Spanish government and receiving four honorary doctorates.

José Greco started the José Greco Foundation for Hispanic Dance in 1972 and retired from the stage for the first time in 1974. He published an autobiography, Gypsy in My Soul: The Autobiography of José Greco, in 1977. He had six children, three boys and three girls. His sons José Luis and Paolo are composers; his son José Greco II is a dancer as are his three daughters, Alessandra, Carmela and Lola.

He came out of retirement in the late 1980s to form a company featuring his children. He appeared on stage for the last time in 1995, at the age of 77. Until his death he was Visiting professor of Dance at Franklin & Marshall College in Lancaster, Pennsylvania.

Death
José Greco died of heart failure in his home in Lancaster, on the last day of the 20th century. In an obituary in the Los Angeles Times, dance critic Lewis Segal noted that Greco had been characterized as "the undisputed Spanish dance star of the '50s and '60s" and "the greatest of all dance stars until the advent of Rudolf Nureyev" in terms of box-office power.

Filmography

Film

Sources
 History of José Greco
 José Luis Greco

References

External links
 Jose Greco Foundation for Spanish Dance
 
Archive film of Jose Greco II dancing Farruca in 1997 at Jacob's Pillow
Roger Machado papers, 1938–1946 Music Division, The New York Public Library.

1918 births
2000 deaths
Flamenco dancers
American choreographers
People of Molisan descent
Artists from Lancaster, Pennsylvania
People from the Province of Campobasso
Italian emigrants to the United States